Hugo Consuegra (born Hugo Consuegra Consuegra Sosa October 26, 1929 in Havana, Cuba – January 25th 2003 in New York City, New York) was a Cuban-American architect and artist specializing in graphic design, painting, and engraving.

His first solo exhibition was held in 1953 at the Lyceum in Havana, and in 1954 he became one of the founding members of Los Once (The Eleven), a group of painters and sculptors who introduced abstract expressionism to Cuba. His work was seen in many shows across the United States and in Europe.
Consuegra was also Professor of Art History at Havana University’s School of Architecture (1960–5), he then went to Madrid in 1967 where he lived before moving to New York in 1970. He became an American citizen in 1975. Throughout his career, Consuegra widely exhibited his work in such cities as: Havana, New York, Paris, Cadiz (Spain), and Sao
Paulo, among others. His work is part of major collections as, Casa de las Américas (Havana), Cintas Foundation (New York), Museo Nacional de Bellas Artes (Havana), Art Museum of the Americas (Washington D.C.), and the Rodríguez Collection (Miami), among others. He was awarded with the Cintas Foundation Fellowship.

Education
He received music lessons in piano at the Conservatorio Hubert de Blanck in Havana, between 1941–1947. Consuegra also studied at the  Escuela Nacional de Bellas Artes “San Alejandro”in Havana from 1943–1947 and in 1955 graduated from the University of Havana in Architecture.
He was member of the artistic group Los Once, along with other artists like Agustín Cárdenas and Viredo Espinosa. From 1970 until his death in 2003, he resided in New York City.

Exhibitions
Consuegra has had personal exhibitions such as: Exposición Hugo Consuegra. Oleos, Acuarelas, Dibujos in 1953 at the Lyceum in Havana; in 1971 Hugo Consuegra. “Curriculum Vitae” at Cisneros Gallery, New York City;in 1993 An Exhibition of Contemporary Cuban Art by Hugo Consuegra at the Cantor Seinuk Group in New York City and in 1993 Hugo Consuegra, Guido Llinás, Tomás Oliva,  a Reunion at the Jadite Galleries, New York City.

He has formed part of many collective exhibitions such as the Salón Anual de Pintura y Escultura in  1946 and 1947  at the National Museum of Fine Arts of Havana; in 1962 3éme Biennale de Paris at Musée d’Art Moderne de la Ville de Paris, Paris, France; in 1969 Maestros Hispánicos de Hoy in the Museo de Bellas Artes de Cadiz, Spain;  in 1987 Abstract Visions, in Museum of Contemporary Hispanic Art in New York City;  and in 1997 Pinturas del Silencio at the Galería La Acacia in Havana.

His work can be found in the permanent collections of Casa de las Américas in Havana; the Oscar B. Cintas Foundation in New York City; the Jersey City Museum of Art in New Jersey; the National Museum of Fine Arts of Havana; the Museum of Modern Art of Latin America in Washington, D.C.; the Pan American Union in Washington, D.C.; and the Printmaking Workshop in New York City.

Awards
Consuegra has obtained many awards and recognitions such as the Gold Medal of Landscape in the XX Salón de Bellas Artes(1948) at the National Museum of Fine Arts of Havana; in 1960 Honorable Mention in Segunda Bienal Interamericana de México at the Palacio de Bellas Artes, Museo Nacional de Arte Moderno, Mexico City, Mexico and Cintas Foundation Fellowship, New York.

References

 Hugo Consuegra edited by Lissette Martinez Herryman & Gustavo Valdes; Ediciones Universal, Miami, Florida, 2006 
 Cuba Encuetros magazine, Profetas Por Conocer by Ileana Fuentes, Fall of 2005 
 El Nuevo Herald , La Trayectoria de Hugo Consuegra by William Navarrete; May 24, 2007  
 Hugo Consuegra; Curriculum Vitae: April 3–24, 1971; (Cisneros Gallery 1971); ASIN B0006WI342
 Eduardo Luis Rodriguez; The Havana Guide: Modern Architecture 1925–1965; (Princeton Architectural Press 2000); 
 John A. Loomis; Revolution of Forms: Cuba's Forgotten Art Schools; (Princeton Architectural Press, 1998);  
  Jose Veigas-Zamora, Cristina Vives Gutierrez, Adolfo V. Nodal, Valia Garzon, Dannys Montes de Oca; Memoria: Cuban Art of the 20th Century; (California/International Arts Foundation 2001); 
 Jose Viegas; Memoria: Artes Visuales Cubanas Del Siglo Xx; (California International Arts 2004);   
 Marta Traba; Art of Latin America, 1900–1980 (Inter-American Development Bank 1994):

External links

 Cuba al Pairo website article on the artist  
 

1929 births
2003 deaths
Artists from Havana
Cuban contemporary artists
Cuban emigrants to the United States